Waverly Central High School is a senior high school in Waverly, Tennessee, United States.  It is managed as part of the Humphreys County School System. The school educates in grades 9–12. For the school year 2019–20, the student population stood at 557. The principal is Shawn Stookey.

Sports
Waverly High is home of the Waverly Tigers and Tigerettes.  The sports program includes basketball, volleyball, softball, baseball, football, track, soccer, tennis, golf and marching band, all of which are boys and girls. The teams play at the "Ray Hampton Stadium", which was named after former coach, Ray Hampton.

References

External links

 
 Humphreys County School System

Educational institutions in the United States with year of establishment missing
Public high schools in Tennessee
Schools in Humphreys County, Tennessee